Harold Briggs (1904–unknown) was an English footballer who played in the Football League for Barrow, Darlington, Hartlepools United and Luton Town.

References

1904 births
Year of death missing
English footballers
Association football forwards
English Football League players
Darlington F.C. players
Luton Town F.C. players
Newark Town F.C. players
Hartlepool United F.C. players
Barrow A.F.C. players
Crook Town A.F.C. players